St Michael's Mount (meaning "hoar rock in woodland") is a tidal island in Mount's Bay, Cornwall, England, United Kingdom. The island is a civil parish and is linked to the town of Marazion by a causeway of granite setts, passable between mid-tide and low water. It is managed by the National Trust, and the castle and chapel have been the home of the St Aubyn family since approximately 1650.

Historically, St Michael's Mount was a Cornish counterpart of Mont-Saint-Michel in Normandy, France, with which it shares the same tidal island characteristics and a similar conical shape, though Mont-Saint-Michel is much taller.

St Michael's Mount is one of 43 unbridged tidal islands that one can walk to from mainland Britain. Part of the island was designated as a Site of Special Scientific Interest in 1995 for its geology.

Etymology 
Its Cornish language name—literally, "the grey rock in a wood"—may represent a folk memory of a time before Mount's Bay was flooded, indicating a description of the mount set in woodland. Remains of trees have been seen at low tides following storms on the beach at Perranuthnoe.

Prehistory
There is evidence of people living in the area during the Neolithic (from circa 4000 to 2500 BC years). The key discovery was of a leaf-shaped flint arrowhead, which was found within a shallow pit on the lower eastern slope, now part of the modern gardens. Other pieces of flint have been found, and at least two could be Mesolithic (circa 8000 to 3500 BC). During the Mesolithic, Britain was still attached to mainland Europe via Doggerland, and archaeologist and prehistorian Caroline Malone noted that during the Late Mesolithic the British Isles were something of a "technological backwater" in European terms, still living as a hunter-gatherer society whilst most of southern Europe had already taken up agriculture and sedentary living. At this time the mount would likely have been an area of dry ground surrounded by a marshy forest. Any Neolithic or Mesolithic camps are likely to have been destroyed by the later extensive building operations, but it is reasonable to expect the mount to have supported either a seasonal or short-term camp for Mesolithic people.

None of the flints, so far recovered, can be positively dated to the Bronze Age (c. 2500 to 800 BC), although any summit cairns would have most likely been destroyed when building the castle. Radiocarbon dating established the submerging of the hazel wood at about 1700 BC. A hoard of copper weapons, once thought to have been found on the mount, are now thought to have been found on nearby Marazion Marsh. Defensive stony banks on the north-eastern slopes are likely to date to the early 1st millennium BC, and are considered to be a cliff castle. The mount is one of several candidates for the island of Ictis, described as a tin trading centre in the Bibliotheca historica of the Sicilian-Greek historian Diodorus Siculus, writing in the first century BC.

History

St Michael's Mount may have been the site of a monastery from the 8th to the early 11th centuries. Edward the Confessor gave the site to the Benedictine order of Mont-Saint-Michel and it was a priory of that abbey until the dissolution of the alien houses as a side-effect of the war in France by Henry V.  Subsequently, it ceased to be a priory, but was reduced to being a secular chapel which was given to the Abbess and Convent of Syon at Isleworth, Middlesex, in 1424. Thus ended its association with Mont-Saint-Michel, and any connection with Looe Island (dedicated to the Archangel Michael). It was a destination for pilgrims, whose devotions were encouraged by an indulgence granted by Pope Gregory in the 11th century. The earliest buildings on the summit, including a castle, date to the 12th century.

Siege, occupation and ownership
Sir Henry de la Pomeroy captured the Mount in 1193, on behalf of Prince John, in the reign of King Richard I, the leader of the previous occupants having 'died of fright' upon learning rumours of Richard's release from captivity. The monastic buildings were built during the 12th century. Various sources state that the earthquake of 1275 destroyed the original Priory Church, although this may be a misunderstanding of the term "St Michael's on the Mount" which referred to the church of St Michael atop Glastonbury Tor. Syon Abbey, a monastery of the Bridgettine Order, acquired the Mount in 1424. Some 20 years later the Mount was granted by Henry VI to King's College, Cambridge on its foundation. However, when Edward IV took the throne during the Wars of the Roses the Mount was returned to the Syon Abbey in 1462.

John de Vere, 13th Earl of Oxford, seized and held it during a siege of 23 weeks against 6,000 of Edward IV's troops in 1473–74. Perkin Warbeck, a pretender to the English throne, occupied the Mount in 1497. Sir Humphrey Arundell, Governor of St Michael's Mount, led the Prayer Book Rebellion of 1549. During the reign of Queen Elizabeth I, it was given to Robert Cecil, Earl of Salisbury, by whose son it was sold to Sir Francis Bassett. During the Civil War, Sir Arthur Bassett, brother of Sir Francis, held the Mount against the Parliament until July 1646.

The Mount was sold in 1659 to Colonel John St Aubyn.  his descendants, the Lords St Levan, remain seated at St Michael's Mount.

18th century
Little is known about the village before the beginning of the 18th century, save that there were a few fishermen's cottages and monastic cottages. After improvements to the harbour in 1727, St Michael's Mount became a flourishing seaport.

The sea rose  in 10 minutes at St Michael's Mount, ebbed at the same rate, and continued to rise and fall for five hours. The 19th-century French writer Arnold Boscowitz claimed that "great loss of life and property occurred upon the coasts of Cornwall."

19th century

By 1811, there were 53 houses and four streets. The pier was extended in 1821 and the population peaked in the same year, when the island had 221 people. There were three schools, a Wesleyan chapel, and three public houses, mostly used by visiting sailors. Following major improvements to nearby Penzance harbour, and the extension of the railway to Penzance in 1852, the village went into decline, and many of the houses and other buildings were demolished.

During the 18th and 19th centuries, the structure of the castle was romanticised. In the late 19th century, the remains of an anchorite were discovered in a tomb within the domestic chapel.

A short, underground narrow gauge railway was constructed in about 1900. It was used to bring goods up to the castle and take away rubbish. In 2018, the tramway was reported as being "still in regular use, perhaps not every day", and is not open to the general public, although a small stretch is visible at the harbour. It is Britain's last functionally operational  railway.

Second World War
The Mount was fortified in World War II, during the invasion crisis of 1940–41. Three pillboxes can be seen to this day.

Sixty-five years after the Second World War, it was suggested based on interviews with contemporaries that the former Nazi Foreign Minister and one-time ambassador to London, Joachim von Ribbentrop, had intended to live at the mount after the planned German conquest. Archived documents revealed that during his time in Britain in the 1930s, when he had proposed an alliance with Nazi Germany, von Ribbentrop frequently visited Cornwall.

National Trust
In 1954, Francis Cecil St Aubyn, 3rd Baron St Levan, gave most of St Michael's Mount to the National Trust, together with a large endowment fund. The St Aubyn family retained a 999-year lease to inhabit the castle and a licence to manage the public viewing of its historic rooms. This is managed in conjunction with the National Trust.

Priors and owners of St Michael's Mount

Preservation

The chapel of St Michael, a 15th-century building, has an embattled tower, one angle of which is a small turret, which served for the guidance of ships. The chapel is extra-diocesan and continues to serve the Order of St John by permission of Lord St Levan. Chapel Rock, on the beach, marks the site of a shrine dedicated to the Virgin Mary, where pilgrims paused to worship before ascending the mount. Many antiquities, comprising plate armour, paintings and furniture, are preserved at the castle. Several houses are built on the hillside facing Marazion, and a spring provides a natural flow of water. There is a row of eight houses at the back of the present village; built in 1885 they are known as Elizabeth Terrace. Some of the houses are occupied by staff working in the castle and elsewhere on the island. The mount's cemetery (currently no public access) contains the graves of former residents of the island and several drowned sailors. There are also buildings that were formerly the steward's house, a changing-room for bathers, the stables, the laundry, a barge house, a sail loft (now a restaurant), and two former inns. A former bowling green adjoins one of the buildings. The population of this parish in 2011 was 35.

The harbour, enlarged in 1823 to accommodate vessels of up to 500 tonnes deadweight, has a pier dating back to the 15th century which has also been renovated. Queen Victoria disembarked from the royal yacht at St Michael's Mount in 1846, and a brass inlay of her footstep can be seen at the top of the landing stage. King Edward VII's footstep is also visible near the bowling green. In 1967 the Queen Mother entered the harbour in a pinnace from the royal yacht Britannia.

Another noteworthy point of interest on the island is its underground railway, which is still used to transport goods from the harbour up to the castle. It was built by miners around 1900, replacing the pack horses which had previously been used. Its steep gradient renders it unsafe for passenger use; thus, the National Trust has made it out-of-bounds for public access.

Repairs were completed in March 2016 following damage from the 2014 winter storms. Some studies indicate that any rise in ocean waters as well as existing natural erosion would put some of the Cornwall coast at risk, including St. Michael's Mount.

Local government

Until recent times, both the mount and the town of Marazion formed part of the parish of St Hilary. St Michael's Mount forms its own civil parish for local government purposes. Currently, this takes the form of a parish meeting as opposed to a parish council (that is, a yearly meeting of electors that does not elect councillors). Lord St Levan currently chairs the St Michael's Mount parish meeting.

Geology
The rock exposures around St Michael's Mount provide an opportunity to see many features of the geology of Cornwall in a single locality. The mount is made of the uppermost part of a granite intrusion into metamorphosed Devonian mudstones or pelites. The granite is itself mineralised with a well-developed sheeted greisen vein system. Due to its geology the island's seaward has been designated a Site of Special Scientific Interest since 1995.

Granites
There are two types of granite visible on the mount. Most of the intrusion is a tourmaline muscovite granite which is variably porphyritic. This is separated from a biotite muscovite granite by pegmatites.

Devonian pelites
Originally laid down as mudstones these pelites were regionally metamorphosed and deformed (mainly folded here) by the Variscan orogeny. They were then affected by the intrusion of the granite, which caused further contact metamorphism, locally forming a hornfels, and mineralisation.

Mineralisation
The best developed mineralisation is found within the uppermost part of the granite itself in the form of sheeted greisen veins. These steep W-E trending veins are thought to have formed by hydraulic fracturing when the fluid pressure at the top of the granite reached a critical level. The granite was fractured and the fluids altered the granite by replacing feldspars with quartz and muscovite. The fluids were also rich in boron, tin and tungsten, and tourmaline, wolframite and cassiterite are common in the greisen veins. As the area cooled the veins became open to fluids from the surrounding country rock and these deposited sulphides, e.g. chalcopyrite and stannite. Greisen veins are also locally developed within the pelites.

Folklore
In prehistoric times, St Michael's Mount may have been a port for the tin trade, and Gavin de Beer made a case for it to be identified with the "tin port" Ictis/Ictin mentioned by Posidonius.

There are popular claims of a tradition that the Archangel Michael appeared before local fishermen on the mount in the 5th century AD.  But in fact this is a modern myth.  The earliest appearance of it is in a version by John Mirk, copying details of the medieval legend for Mont-Saint-Michel from the Golden Legend.  The folk-story was examined and found to be based on a 15th-century misunderstanding by Max Muller.

The chronicler John of Worcester relates under the year 1099 that St Michael's Mount was located five or six miles (10 km) from the sea, enclosed in a thick wood, but that on the third day of November the sea overflowed the land, destroying many towns and drowning many people as well as innumerable oxen and sheep; the Anglo-Saxon Chronicle records under the date 11 November 1099, "The sea-flood sprung up to such a height, and did so much harm, as no man remembered that it ever did before". The Cornish legend of Lyonesse, an ancient kingdom said to have extended from Penwith toward the Isles of Scilly, also talks of land being inundated by the sea.

One of the earliest references to the mount (originally named "Dynsol" or "Dinsul"), was in the mid 11th century when it was "Sanctus Michael beside the sea".

In the 1600s, John Milton used the Mount as the setting for the finale of what was once one of the most famous poems in English literature, his "Lycidas", which drew on the traditional sea-lore that had it that the archangel Michael sat in a great stone chair at the top of the Mount, seeing far over the sea and thus protecting England. In the mid-1850s the poem's scenes of the drowning of Lycidas, in the seas below the Mount, were illustrated in engravings and paintings by J. M. W. Turner. The poem drew together various traditions from the Bible, classical mythology and local folklore to offer an elegy for the pagan world that had faded away.

Legend

During the 6th century, before a castle was built, according to legend, the island St. Michael's Mount sits upon was once home to an 18-foot giant named Cormoran, who lived in a cave with his ill-gotten treasures obtained by terrorizing local towns and villages. That is, until a young farmer's son named Jack took on this gigantic menace, who had an appetite for cattle and children, and killed him by trapping him in a concealed pit, bringing down his axe upon his head. When he returned home, the elders in the village gave him a hero's welcome, and henceforth, called him "Jack the Giant Killer".

In modern popular culture
The mount has featured in a number of films, including the 1979 film Dracula, where it was prominently featured as the exterior of Castle Dracula. It appeared in the 1983 James Bond film Never Say Never Again, as two guided missiles armed with nuclear warheads fly over the English countryside and out to sea, passing directly over St Michael's Mount. In the 2003 film Johnny English it was used as the exterior of the character Pascal Sauvage's French chateau, in 2012 it was a filming location for the fantasy adventure movie Mariah Mundi and the Midas Box, and in 2021 it was used for the Game of Thrones prequel series House of the Dragon.

"Mt Saint Michel + Saint Michaels Mount" is the title of an experimental electronic track by musician Aphex Twin, who grew up in Cornwall, and in Michael Moorcock's series of Fantasy novels about Prince Corum, a fictionalised version of St Michael's Mount appears as Moidel's Mount.

It was one of the locations used on BBC One "Balloon" Idents which were used on the channel from 4 October 1997 to 29 March 2002.

Under its Cornish name of Karrek Loos yn Koos, the island appears prominently in Giles Kristian's 2018 historical fiction novel Lancelot.

St. Michael's Mount is the setting for The Secrets of Winter, a murder mystery written by Nicola Upson featuring the detectives Archie Penrose and Upson's fictionalized version of the author Josephine Tey, published in 2020.

Images

See also

 St Aubyn family
 Mont-Saint-Michel, France
 List of monastic houses in Cornwall
 Cormoran
 Skellig Michael

References

Further reading
John Taylor, ''Albion: the earliest history" (Dublin, 2016)

External links

 St Michael's Mount information at the National Trust
 St Michael's Mount website
 Pliny: Naturalis Historia (IV:XVI.102-4)
 Cornwall Record Office Online Catalogue for St Michael's Mount 
 
 St. Michaels Mount (photo by Chris Hasenbichler)
 The Medieval Legend of the Appearance of St Michael at St Michael's Mount in Cornwall: a Modern Myth - Discussion of all the sources.
 Crossing times to St Michael's Mount

Civil parishes in Cornwall
Castles in Cornwall
Church of England church buildings in Cornwall
Islands of Cornwall
Gardens in Cornwall
Tourist attractions in Cornwall
Grade I listed buildings in Cornwall
Grade I listed castles
Houses in Cornwall
Military history of Cornwall
Benedictine monasteries in England
Monasteries in Cornwall
National Trust properties in Cornwall
Tidal islands of England
Sites of Special Scientific Interest in Cornwall
Sites of Special Scientific Interest notified in 1995
Historic house museums in Cornwall
Peaks dedicated to Michael (archangel)
Grade II listed parks and gardens in Cornwall
Country houses in Cornwall
Grade I listed houses